Insaaf Ki Dagar Pe (On the path of justice) is an Indian song written by Shakeel Badayuni. It is a patriotic song represents the newfound optimism of Independent India. it addresses children and tells them their responsibility as Indian citizens. This a film soundtrack of Bollywood film Gunga Jumna (1961). This song was sung by Hemant Kumar.

The song was termed as evergreen and its attraction has never subsided.

Lyrics 
The lyrics of the song was in Hindi and was published in several books.

Insaaf Ki Dagar Pe

Baccho Dikhao Chal Ke

Ye Desh Hai Tumhara

Neta Tumhi Ho Kal Ke

Duniya Ke Rang Sahna

Aur Kuch Na Muh Se Kahna

Sacchaiyo Ke Bal Pe

Aage Ko Badhte Rahna

Rakh Doge Ek Dim Tum

Sansaar Ko Badal Ke

Insaaf Ki Dagar Pe

Baccho Dikhao Chal Ke

Ye Desh Hai Tumhara

Neta Tumhi Ho Kal Ke

Apne Ho Ya Paraye

Sabke Liye Ho Nyaay

Dekho Kadam Tumhara

Hargij Na Dagmagaye

Raste Bade Kathin Hai

Chalna Sambhal Sambhal Ke

Insaaf Ki Dagar Pe

Baccho Dikhao Chal Ke

Ye Desh Hai Tumhara

Neta Tumhi Ho Kal Ke

Insaniyat Ke Sar Pe

Ijjat Ka Taaj Rakhna

Tan Man Ki Bhent Dekar

Bharat Ki Laaj Rakhna

Jeevan Naya Milega

Antim Chita Me Jal Ke

Insaaf Ki Dagar Pe

Baccho Dikhao Chal Ke

Ye Desh Hai Tumhara

Neta Tumhi Ho Kal Ke

Lyrics-

References

1961 songs
Indian patriotic songs
Hindi songs